The World Between Us is a Philippine television drama romance series broadcast by GMA Network. Directed by Dominic Zapata, it stars Alden Richards and Jasmine Curtis-Smith. It premiered on July 5, 2021 on the network's Telebabad line up replacing First Yaya. The series concluded on January 7, 2022 with a total of 75 episodes. It was replaced by I Can See You in its timeslot.

The series is streaming online on YouTube.

Cast and characters

Lead cast
 Alden Richards as Luisito "Louie" Asuncion
 Jasmine Curtis-Smith as Emilia "Lia" Libradilla-Asuncion

Supporting cast
 Tom Rodriguez as Brian Libradilla / Brian Delgado
 Jaclyn Jose as Jacinta "Yachie" Delgado
 Dina Bonnevie as Rachel Cruz-Libradilla
 Sid Lucero as Eric Carlos
 Kelley Day as Audrey Villacer
 Yana Asistio as Jacqueline "Jackie" Carlos-Libradilla
 Don Bocco as Agapito "Pitoy" Flores
 Jericho Arceo as Edison Tomas
 Celeste Guevarra as Aira
 Lyra Micolob as Gina

Guest cast
 Glydel Mercado as Clara Asuncion
 Will Ashley as young Brian
 Shanelle Agustin as young Lia
 Izzy Canillo as young Louie
 Ashley Rivera as young Rachel
 Dion Ignacio as Franco Libradilla
 Faye Lorenzo as young Yachie
 Jong Cuenco as Alvaro Villacer
 Seb Pajarillo as Aga
 Angelo Alagban as Karl
 Karl Aquino as Dexter
 Gould Aceron as Drew
 Manel Sevidal as Carla
 Ella Cristofani as Megan
 Ricky Davao as Emmanuelito "Emmanuel/Noli" Asuncion
 Mia Pangyarihan as Robin

Production
Principal photography commenced in June 2021.

Ratings
According to AGB Nielsen Philippines' Nationwide Urban Television Audience Measurement People in television homes, the pilot episode of The World Between Us earned a 13.9% rating. While the final episode scored a 14.3% rating.

References

External links
 
 

2021 Philippine television series debuts
2022 Philippine television series endings
Filipino-language television shows
GMA Network drama series
Philippine romance television series
Television shows set in the Philippines